Peermade, also spelt Peerumedu is a village, Grama Panchayat and hill station in the state of Kerala, India.

Demographics
As of 2011 Census, Peerumade had a population of 22,213 with 11,049 males and 11,164 females. The average sex ratio was 1010 lower than the state average of 1084. In Peerumade, 8.8% of the population was under 6 years of age. Peerumade had an average literacy of 89.1% lower than the state average of 94%; male literacy was 93.9% and female literacy was 84.5%.

Geography
The landscape of Peermade includes spectacular waterfalls, open grass lands and pine forests.

History

Peermade was once the summer retreat of the Maharajas of Travancore. During those periods these regions were quite inaccessible, covered by dense forests and was inhabited by certain tribes like 'Malappandarams' and 'Malayarans'.  The archaeological excavations points out that there was an ancient Neolithic culture flourished in the high-ranges which wasn't written or recorded. But the findings of cultural remnants from the hill tracks near Kumily and Vandiperiyar provides some factual evidences of the existence of a rich culture.

Peermade was the highest elevation on the mountain route that once connected the Travancore with Madurai in ancient Tamilakam. The mountain barriers created by the ghats separated these two regions.
It has herds of elephants and other wildlife as well as lakes.

Etymology
The name is sometimes related to the Sufi saint, 'Peer Mohammed', as "hill of the Peer" (പീരുമേട്).

There is also a local saying that the name "Peerumedu" has come from the large number of "Pera trees" ie. Guava trees that existed way back, Which inturn came to be called as "Peramedu" and now famously known as Peerumedu.

Spices

The area is extremely fertile and until recently featured lush plantations of coffee, tea, cardamon, and coconut. With a long history of spice growing, the focus is now on the production of organic black pepper, white pepper, ginger and turmeric.

At a 2006 show, spice growers from Peermade displayed samples of organically grown spices including cardamom, black pepper, white pepper, nutmeg, mace, cloves, turmeric, ginger, vanilla beans, vanilla powder and herbs such as oregano, sage, thyme and rosemary. Oils of thyme and rosemary were also displayed.

Education
Mar Baselios Christian College of Engineering and Technology and Marian College are located at Kuttikanam in Peermade.

Politics
Peermade assembly constituency is part of Idukki (Lok Sabha constituency).
Vazhoor Soman is the current MLA of peermade.

Gallery

See also

 Thodupuzha
 Erattupetta
 Palai
 Kumily
 Kuttikkanam
 Manjumala
 Mundakayam
 Kottayam
 Vagamon

Notes

Books
 The Story of Peermade by George Thengummoottil http://theindia.info/theIndiainfo/downloads/The%20Story%20of%20Peermade.pdf

External links

Hill stations in Kerala
Populated places in the Western Ghats
Cities and towns in Idukki district
Geography of Idukki district